Fakhrul Islam (died April 11, 2013) was a Pakistani politician.

Death
On April 11, 2013, he was shot at age 46.

References

2013 deaths
Year of birth missing
Deaths by firearm in Sindh